Carenum tibiale is a species of ground beetle in the subfamily Scaritinae. It was described by Sloane in 1894.

References

tibiale
Beetles described in 1894